The Lafayette School Corporation administers three high schools, one intermediate school, one Jr. High School and eight elementary schools in Lafayette, Indiana.  Its administrative offices are at 2300 Cason Street in Lafayette, Indiana.

History of the Lafayette School Corporation

Originally known as the School City of Lafayette, the district became the Lafayette School Corporation on January 1, 1963. Its superintendents have included:
 A. J. Vawter, 1855–1863
 J. W. Molière, 1863–1867
 Jacob Merrill, 1867–1890
 Edward Ayres, 1890–1902
 Russell Bedgood, 1902–1904
 Robert F. Hight, 1904–1921
 D. W. Horton, 1921–1923
 A. E. Highley, 1923–1932
 Morris E. McCarty, 1932–1947
 Aaron T. Lindley, 1947–1952
 Dr. J. Russell Hiatt, 1952
 Dr. Edward Eiler

The district's current superintendent is Mr. Les Huddle.

Lafayette's school system has built a reputation for extracurricular programs, especially its band, choral, and visual arts programs. The Marching Bronchos, currently under the direction of Tyler Long, have qualified for ISSMA State Marching Band Finals seven times since 1983 and have performed in Hollywood, Philadelphia, Orlando and Hawaii. The wind ensemble has consistently qualified for ISSMA State Concert Band Finals since 2001. The concert choir, Varsity Singers, under the direction of Michael Bennett, has consistently qualified for ISSMA State Concert Choir Finals since 1994, receiving second-place honors three times and placing first in 2018. The show choir The First Edition is nationally known, including performances in Miami, Orlando, Philadelphia, Nashville, Washington D.C., Chicago, Boston, Los Angeles, New York City, Europe, Mexico and the Bahamas, and has been recognized on four occasions since 1990 by the Indiana General Assembly for outstanding achievements in musical performance and community contributions. Students in the visual arts program consistently take top honors at state and national level competitions.

Board of School Trustees

Current members of the elected non-partisan Board of School Trustees of the Lafayette School Corporation include:

All regular meetings of the Board of School Trustees of the Lafayette School Corporation are held at the Hiatt Administration Center located at 2300 Cason St. in Lafayette, Indiana, on the second Monday of each month at 7 p.m.

Schools

High schools
 Jefferson High School 
 Oakland Academy 
 Greater Lafayette Career Academy

Middle schools
 Lafayette Sunnyside Intermediate School 
 Lafayette Tecumseh Junior High School

Elementary schools
 Earhart Elementary School 
 Edgelea Elementary School 
 Glen Acres Elementary School 
 Miami Elementary School 
 Miller Elementary School 
 Murdock Elementary School 
 Oakland Elementary School
 Vinton Elementary School

2006-2008 school years
In August 2006, Lafayette Tecumseh Junior High School (formerly Tecumseh Middle School) was renamed and assigned to serve all seventh and eighth-grade students in the LSC. Lafayette Sunnyside Middle School was renamed Sunnyside Intermediate School and started serving all fifth and sixth-grade students in 2010.

References

 Cecil S. Webb, Historical Growth of the Schools of Lafayette, Indiana, Lafayette School Corporation, 1972.

External links
 Lafayette School Corporation

Lafayette, Indiana
School districts in Indiana
School districts established in 1855
Education in Tippecanoe County, Indiana
1855 establishments in Indiana